Jack Adams (1895–1968) was a Canadian ice hockey player and coach of the Detroit Red Wings.

Jack Adams may also refer to:

Sports
 Jack Adams Award, National Hockey League award for coaches
 Jack Adams (ice hockey, born 1920) (1920–1996), Canadian pro hockey player with the Montreal Canadiens
 Jack Adams (rugby union) (1986–2021), English professional rugby union player
 Jack Adams (basketball), in the American Basketball League

Other
 Jack A. Adams (1922–2010), Bronze Star recipient in World War II, professor at University of Illinois Urbana-Champaign
 John Adams (mutineer) (1767–1829), known as "Jack Adams" last survivor of the Bounty mutineers
 John Adams, 1st Baron Adams (1890–1960), British trade unionist and politician, known as "Jack Adams"
 John Adams, pseudonymous writer of NEQUA or The Problem of the Ages

See also
 John Adams (disambiguation)